Bingen Fernández Bustinza (born December 15, 1972 in Bermeo, Basque Country) is a Spanish former professional road bicycle racer, who last rode for .

Major results

1997
2nd Trofeo Forla de Navarra
5th Overall Vuelta a Andalucía
10th Tour de l'Avenir
1999
1st Mountains classification Vuelta a La Rioja
8th GP Miguel Induráin
2000
3rd Overall Vuelta a Aragón
4th Overall Tour of the Basque Country
2001
5th GP Primavera
2002
8th GP Miguel Induráin
2003
9th GP Miguel Induráin
2004
10th Overall Volta a la Comunitat Valenciana

Grand Tour general classification results timeline

External links 

1972 births
Living people
People from Bermeo
Cyclists from the Basque Country (autonomous community)
Spanish male cyclists
Sportspeople from Biscay